The Silver Sorceress is a DC Comics character and member of the Champions of Angor with the alter ego of Laura Cynthia Neilsen. She first appeared in Justice League of America #87, (February 1971), and is an homage to the Scarlet Witch. As her name suggests, she possesses magical powers which have become more advanced over time.

Fictional character biography
The Silver Sorceress,  Blue Jay and Wandjina (characters based on Marvel's Scarlet Witch, Yellowjacket and Thor, respectively) come from an alternate Earth, the only survivors of a nuclear holocaust. In their original appearance they come to Earth after being manipulated into seeking revenge for the destruction of their world against the Justice League.  After initially mistaking each other for villains, the two teams unite to fight the robots that originally manipulated them both.

The Silver Sorceress and the Justifiers return in Justice League vol. 2 #2 (June 1987) as they attempt to destroy this Earth's stockpile of nuclear weapons, before being confronted by the Justice League and the Rocket Reds. Wandjina seemingly sacrifices himself to save innocent people from a nuclear meltdown. It is later revealed all three were part of a much larger super-team, all analogues of Marvel Comics heroes. The Silver Sorceress and Blue Jay decide to remain on Earth.

Later, the Sorceress has the pleasure of meeting and rescuing one of the few survivors of her world, a celebrity entertainer known as Mitch Wacky (a parody of Walt Disney). He is one of, if not the most popular people in Silver's old society, revered because he brings so much entertainment. Mitch's weakness, the common flu, demonstrates essential differences between Silver's worlds and the DCU, as they do not know how to combat it. Mitch is soon cured. Silver helps the League confront and battle the Extremists, robotic duplicates of the entities that have ravaged her homeworld.

She remains with the team as an active member until her death at the hands of Dreamslayer, one of the entities who had destroyed her old world. Dreamslayer manages to take over the mind of Maxwell Lord, a close friend and leader of various aspects of the Justice League. Using Lord's persuasion powers, he takes over the mobile island of Kooey Kooey Kooey, using it and Mitch Wacky as a base to rebuild the Extremists. When Mitch is not needed anymore, he is brutally killed. Silver and the League attack the island and its natives are brainwashed into fighting back. Silver falls victim to the need not to hurt the innocent natives and she ends up shot in the stomach with an arrow. As she lay dying, she manages to subdue and entrap Dreamslayer, temporarily ending his threat.  The League members bury Silver Sorceress on Kooey Kooey Kooey island.

Powers and abilities
Silver Sorceress is a magic user of advanced abilities.  While she had to use a combination of magic and technology to create the original doorway from Angor to that of the Justice League, she is later able to do so with magic alone.

Other versions
 In Justice League Europe Annual #2, the time-traveler known as Waverider visits the Justice League of Europe on his own mission and finds himself viewing an alternate, highly probable 'future' of Silver's. In it, she accidentally travels far back in time and is saved from a large predator by the over-enthusiastic hero known as Anthro.  She is eventually returned to her timeline by a time-travelling Elongated Man.
 In Showcase #63 (July–August 1966), the Inferior Five face a team of supervillains based on Marvel Comics Avengers. This team has a member named Silver Sorceress that is also based on Marvel's Scarlet Witch; however, she is otherwise unrelated to the version from Angor.
 Silver Sorceress makes a brief cameo appearance in issue #4 of the JLA/Avengers crossover miniseries. With other spellcasters, she tries to stop Krona bringing reinforcements.
 A new version of the Silver Sorceress appears in Lord Havok and The Extremists #5. A denizen of Earth-8, she is called Anna and is the daughter of Doctor Diehard. She dies by the end of the limited series.

References

External links
 Silver Sorceress at the Unofficial Guide to the DC Universe

Characters created by Dick Dillin
Characters created by Mike Friedrich
Comics characters introduced in 1971
DC Comics characters who use magic
DC Comics female superheroes
Scarlet Witch